Easy Hogar y Construcción is a chain of South American homecenters. The company was founded in Argentina in 1993, in Chile in 1994 and in Colombia in 2007, by Chilean Conglomerate Cencosud.

History
Easy, based in Florida, Chile, was founded in Argentina in 1993 and the following year opened its first store in Chile. In 2001, it bought out The Home Depot's branches in Argentina and Chile and rebranded them as Easy. The company currently has 82 branches  in South America, 29 in Chile, 49 in Argentina (plus 10 Blaisten construction supply stores), and 4 in Colombia.

Locations

Argentina 
 Buenos Aires City: 
 Buenos Aires Province: 
 Rosario, San Miguel de Tucumán, Neuquén, Mendoza, Trelew, Santa Fe, San Juan, San Luis, Córdoba, La Rioja, General Roca

Chile 
 Santiago: 
 Antofagasta, Copiapó, La Serena, Viña del Mar, Valparaíso, Quilpué, Quillota, Los Andes, Rancagua, Curicó, Talca, Linares, Chillán, Los Ángeles, Hualpén , Temuco, Osorno, Puerto Montt

Colombia 
 Bogotá:

References

External links
Easy website

Home improvement
Hypermarkets
Chilean brands
Cencosud
Retail companies established in 1993
1993 establishments in Argentina